Oberea seminigra is a species of beetle in the family Cerambycidae. It was described by Chevrolat in 1841. It is known from the Philippines. It contains the varietas Oberea seminigra var. clareabdominalis.

References

Beetles described in 1841
seminigra